The Levant is a 1990 epic poem by the Romanian writer Mircea Cărtărescu. Consisting of twelve cantos in verse, the narrative begins in the early 19th century, and follows a band of Wallachian adventurers and pirates, who return to their native land in an attempt to overthrow an oppressor. Cărtărescu uses the poem to highlight oriental influences in Romanian culture.

See also
 1990 in poetry
 Romanian literature

References

External links
 The Levant at the publisher's website 

1990 poetry books
1990 poems
Epic poems
Epic poems in Romanian
Works by Mircea Cărtărescu
Romanian poems